The discography of American country music artist Wynonna contains nine studio albums, four compilation albums, two video albums, one live album, one extended play (EP), 43 singles, 11 music videos and one other-charting song. She achieved success as one half of the mother-daughter duo, The Judds. In 1991, the duo split and Wynonna signed a solo recording contract with MCA Records that year. In March 1992, her debut studio album entitled Wynonna reached number one on the Billboard Top Country Albums chart and number four on the Billboard 200. The album spawned three number one hits on the Billboard Hot Country Songs chart: "She Is His Only Need," "I Saw the Light" and "No One Else on Earth." The album also sold over five million copies. In 1993, it was followed by Tell Me Why, which certified platinum in the United States. It also topped the country albums chart and reached number five on the Billboard 200 It spawned five more top ten country hits, including the title track and "Rock Bottom."

In 1996, her third studio album Revelations was issued. It produced the number one hit "To Be Loved by You" and reached number two on the Billboard country albums chart. It was followed by 1997's The Other Side, which debuted in the Billboard country top five. It spawned two top 20 hits, including "When Love Starts Talkin'." In 2000, Judd released her fifth studio album, New Day Dawning, which produced no major hit singles. In 2003, Judd returned with her sixth studio effort, What the World Needs Now Is Love. It reached number one on the Top Country Albums chart and number eight on the Billboard 200. It produced Judd's final top 20 country hit: "What the World Needs." In 2005, she released her first live effort entitled Her Story: Scenes from a Lifetime. Its only single, "Attitude," is her final country top 40 hit to date. In 2006, her first holiday album reached number ten on the country albums chart. In 2009, she issued an album of cover songs entitled Sing: Chapter 1. The title track reached number four on the Billboard Hot Dance Club Songs chart. In 2016, Judd released her eighth studio offering called Wynonna & the Big Noise on Curb Records.

Albums

Studio albums

Compilation albums

Live albums

Extended plays

Singles

As lead artist

As a featured artist

Other charted songs

Videography

Video albums

Music videos

See also
The Judds discography

Notes

References

External links
 Wynonna Judd discography at her official website

Country music discographies
Discographies of American artists
Discography